Gopal Bhargava (born 1 July 1952) is an Indian politician and a senior cabinet minister in the Government of Madhya Pradesh. He was sworn in as a cabinet minister on July 2, 2020, for his sixth term, which is the highest number of terms any minister can complete in the government. He has also been the leader of opposition in the 15th Madhya Pradesh Legislative Assembly. He is the only person who has served as a cabinet minister for 15 consecutive years in the Government of Madhya Pradesh, India. He belongs to the Bharatiya Janata Party, and has been the member of the Legislative Assembly eight times consecutively, representing Rehli since 1985.

Early life and education
Bhargava was born on July 1, 1952, to Pandit Shankarlal Bhargava (Kakkaji). His grandfather was a social activist & leader. He started his primary education at his hometown Garhakota and later moved to Sagar for his higher education. Bhargava holds a degree in B.Sc., MA (Political Science) and has completed LLB (Law) from Dr. H.S. Gour University, Sagar.

Political career

His political career started with his first election to the Municipal Council in Garhakota. He was the president of the students union at the Government Boys Higher Secondary School, Garhakota, in 1965. In 1984–85, he participated in a youth movement for a college building and was imprisoned in Sagar Jail for some time.

He was first elected as president to the Garhakota Municipal Council in 1980 and then as a Member of the Legislative Assembly from Rehli in 1984. In 2003, Bhargava was chosen to become the cabinet minister in Government of Madhya Pradesh led by Uma Bharti. He also became President of MP Agro-Development Corporation, President of MP Agriculture Board, President of State Warehousing Corporation, President of MP state civil supplies corporation, President of Apex Bank MP and many other departments.

In 2008, he was sworn in as cabinet minister of Panchayat & Rural Development, Social Justice in the Government of Madhya Pradesh led by Shivraj Singh Chouhan.

In 2013, Gopal Bhargava retained the Rehli Vidhan Sabha seat by over 52,000 votes without campaigning, and led the Bharatiya Janata Party (BJP) to a third consecutive victory. On December 12, 2013, he was sworn in for his third consecutive term as cabinet minister (most senior, popular & highly decorated, reputed minister, serving same as deputy chief minister of state stand next to Shivraj Singh Chouhan) and again took charge of Panchayat & Rural Development, Social Justice & Co-operative Society.

In 2018, he was re-elected from Rehli and became the most senior legislator in Madhya Pradesh Vidhan Sabha.

On January 7, 2019, he was elected Leader of the Opposition in the 15th Madhya Pradesh Legislative Assembly. He resigned as leader of the opposition after the BJP formed a government in Madhya Pradesh on March 23, 2020. He was inducted into Shivraj Singh Chauhan's cabinet on July 2, 2020, and was given the portfolio of Public Works Department and Cottage & Rural Industries. He is undefeated in his political career, spanning four decades.

Personal life
Bhargava has been married to Rekha Bhargava since 1981. They have one son and one daughter.

His son Abhishek Gopal Bhargava is a politician, was the state vice president of Bharatiya Janata Yuva Morcha in Madhya Pradesh, and oversees and manages his work in his constituency. Abhishek also claimed candidacy for Member of Parliament from the Damoh Lok Sabha constituency in the 2019 Indian general election.

References

External links 
 Personal website
 Members of Legislative assembly - Vidhan sabha website

People from Sagar district
Living people
Madhya Pradesh MLAs 1985–1990
Madhya Pradesh MLAs 1993–1998
Madhya Pradesh MLAs 1998–2003
Madhya Pradesh MLAs 2003–2008
Madhya Pradesh MLAs 2008–2013
1952 births
State cabinet ministers of Madhya Pradesh
Bharatiya Janata Party politicians from Madhya Pradesh
Madhya Pradesh MLAs 2018–2023